USS Avenge (AMc-66) was an Accentor-class coastal minesweeper acquired by the U.S. Navy for the dangerous task of removing mines from minefields laid in the water to prevent ships from passing.

Bulwark was laid down on 8 May 1941 at South Bristol, Maine, by the Bristol Yacht Building Co.; renamed Avenge on 17 May 1941; launched on 14 February 1942; sponsored by Mrs. William A. Parker; and placed in service at Boston, Massachusetts, on 2 April 1942.

World War II service 
 
Following fitting out at Boston, Avenge sailed for Hampton Roads, Virginia, and arrived at Yorktown, Virginia, on 23 April for training at the Mine Warfare School. Upon completion of the training, Avenge reported to the 6th Naval District, Charleston, South Carolina, for duty.
 
Avenge served at Charleston for the duration of her career.

Post-war deactivation 

On 14 December 1945, Avenge was placed out of service and laid up in the Wando River. Her name was struck from the Navy list on 8 January 1946, and the ship was turned over to the Maritime Commission for disposal on 8 August. Avenge was subsequently sold to the United Fisheries Co., Gloucester, Massachusetts.

References

External links 
 Dictionary of American Naval Fighting Ships
 NavSource Online: Mine Warfare Vessel Photo Archive - Avenge (AMc 66) - ex-Bulwark

Accentor-class minesweepers
Ships built in South Bristol, Maine
1942 ships
World War II minesweepers of the United States